Jennifer Fleiss is the co-founder of Rent the Runway and , is the head of Jetblack, a firm operating within Walmart's startup incubator, Store No. 8.

Early life and education

Fleiss grew up in New York City. She graduated cum laude from Yale University with a BA in 2005. She later attended Harvard Business School, where she met the future co-founder of Rent the Runway, Jennifer Hyman, and graduated with an MBA in 2009.

Career

Fleiss co-founded Rent the Runway with Jennifer Hyman. She served as head of business development and as a member of the firm's Board of Directors. Fleiss managed business growth and long-term strategy planning, including key partnerships and sponsorship sales. She also assists with company-wide infrastructure, project planning, and key logistics decisions.

Recode reported that Code Eight was testing a personal shopping service in New York City, and had posted a job listing for "a trusted personal shopping companion that surprises and delights the high-net-worth urban consumer."

Fleiss presents on topics such as the sharing economy, female leadership, entrepreneurship, and industry trends in retail, social media, and marketing.

Fleiss started her career crafting long-term company strategy in the Strategic Planning Group at Morgan Stanley. She then moved on to Lehman Brothers’ Asset Management Group where she was responsible for analyzing business growth opportunities through acquisitions, international expansion and new product strategies.

Awards and honors

Fleiss has received various honors and recognitions, including Fortune’s “40 Under 40” and “Most Powerful Women Entrepreneurs”; Forbes’s “Disruptors 2013”; Inc.’s “30 Under 30”; Fast Company’s “Most Influential Women in Technology”; Ernst & Young’s “Entrepreneur of the Year” New York Area Regional finalist; and Fashionista.com's “Most Influential People in New York Fashion.”

References

External links

American chief executives of fashion industry companies
American women chief executives
American technology chief executives
Harvard Business School alumni
Yale University alumni
American women company founders
American company founders
Living people
American retail chief executives
Year of birth missing (living people)
21st-century American women